Willem Marinus van Rossum, C.Ss.R. (3 September 1854 – 30 August 1932) was a Dutch prelate of the Roman Catholic Church. He was made a cardinal in 1911, led the Apostolic Penitentiary from 1915 to 1918, and served as Prefect of the Congregation for the Propagation of the Faith from 1918 until his death.

Life
Willem van Rossum was born in Zwolle, Netherlands, to Jan and Hendrika (née Veldwillems) van Rossum. He entered the Minor Seminary of Culemborg in 1867 and joined the Congregation of the Most Holy Redeemer, more commonly known as the Redemptorists, on 15 June 1873. He made his profession as a Redemptorist on 16 June 1874.

He was ordained a priest in Wittem on 17 October 1879. He then taught Latin and rhetoric in Roermond and was a professor of dogmatic theology at the Scholasticate of Wittem from 1883 to 1892. He became the prefect of studies there in 1886 and its rector in 1893.

After becoming a member of the Redemptorist community in Rome in 1895, Rossum was named a consultor to the Congregation of the Holy Office on 25 December 1896. He also became a counselor to the Commission for the Codification of Canon Law on 15 April 1904. He served as general consultor of the Redemptorists from 1909 to 1911.

On 27 November 1911, although Von Rossum was not yet a bishop, Pope Pius X named him Cardinal-Deacon of San Cesareo in Palatio, the first Dutch cardinal. In 1914, he became president of the Pontifical Biblical Commission. On 1 October 1915, he was named head of the Apostolic Penitentiary. On 6 December 1915, he was also raised to the rank of Cardinal Priest, with the titular church of Santa Croce in Gerusalemme. He was appointed Prefect of the Congregation for the Propagation of the Faith on 12 March 1918. Pope Benedict consecrated him a bishop on 19 May of that year.

He participated in the 1914 papal conclave that elected Pope Benedict XV and the 1922 conclave that elected Pope Pius XI. At the latter he was thought a possible compromise candidate.

Van Rossum died on 30 August 1932 in a Maastricht hospital,  after falling ill on returning from a visit to Denmark. He was buried in the Witten cemetery, but later in the Redemptorist church in Wittem.

References

External links
 Catholic Hierarchy: Willem Marinus Cardinal van Rossum, C.SS.R.  

1854 births
1932 deaths
Dutch cardinals
People from Zwolle
Members of the Congregation for the Propagation of the Faith
Major Penitentiaries of the Apostolic Penitentiary
Redemptorist cardinals
Cardinals created by Pope Pius X